Tipps End is an English hamlet on the B1100 road between Welney and Christchurch, Cambridgeshire. It is also sometimes referred to as "Tips End". It is on the border of the Isle of Ely, Cambridgeshire and Norfolk,  to the east of March, Cambridgeshire.

Notable residents 

 Captain Tom Moore, fundraiser

Further reading

References 

Hamlets in Norfolk
King's Lynn and West Norfolk